"Star for a Week (Dino)" is a pop-rock song by British singer-songwriter Steve Harley, which was released as a promotional single in 1993 from his third solo album Yes You Can. The single coincided with the UK release of the album that year (Yes You Can had been released in Europe in 1992). It was the second single to be released from the album, following "Irresistible" as a European single in 1992. "Star for a Week (Dino)" was written by Harley, and produced by Harley and Matt Butler.

Background
"Star for a Week" was first performed live at Harley's sold out Hammersmith Odeon concert in October 1979. For many years after, the song was regularly performed live, which established the song as a fan favourite. After signing to RAK Records in 1984, a studio recording of the song was to be included on Harley's 1986 solo album El Gran Senor, however the album was shelved after the label went bankrupt in 1986.

A few years later, the song was re-recorded for the Yes You Can album. Like much of the album, it was recorded and remixed at the White House Studios in Bures, Suffolk. After Yes You Can was released in Europe in 1992, Harley struck a deal with Food for Thought Records, who gave the album a UK release in 1993. "Star for a Week (Dino)" was issued as a promotional single in attempt to gain radio-play and promote the album.

Inspiration
The song's lyrics are based on the true story of Orestes Babouris, a 17-year-old of Brandon, Suffolk, who was also known as Dino. In the period of a week in August 1979, Babouris carried out a number of armed robberies and stole several cars. Initially he and another 17-year-old, Andrew Ross, stole £700 from a man using imitations guns. They booked themselves into the Golden Galleon Motel at Oulton Broad to lie low, and fired at two policemen when they arrived to question the youths on 16 August. Dino's mother, Mrs. Pearl Babouris, pleaded to her son on television and radio to hand himself in, and the "most wanted teenager in Britain" continued to evade capture until 23 August when he was stopped at a roadblock at Thrapston and taken to Huntingdon Police Station. Babouris was given a six-year sentence, whereas Ross, who was captured at an earlier date, was given a four-year sentence.

Intrigued by the story, Harley wrote "Star for a Week" using many lines that he heard through TV news coverage of the two outlaws, and quotes from Dino's mother in particular. The line featuring "the man with no name" referenced the Clint Eastwood character of the same name, which a victimised postmistress had used to describe Dino. Harley felt the story had a little bit of "Billy the Kid" about it.

In a live performance of the song at Brighton in 1989, Harley revealed: 

Speaking of the song's story at a 2011 concert in Athens, Greece, Harley commented further:

Release
"Star for a Week (Dino)" was released by Food for Thought Records on CD in the UK only. The B-Side, "The Lighthouse", was written by Harley and was taken from Yes You Can. The single had no artwork and was issued in a clear plastic sleeve.

Following its original release, the song has appeared on three compilations; 1998's More Than Somewhat – The Very Best of Steve Harley, 2000's Best of the 70's and 2006's The Cockney Rebel – A Steve Harley Anthology.

Live versions of the song have also been recorded and released. The song was performed at Steve Harley & Cockney Rebel's 1984 concert at the Camden Palace, London, which was filmed for TV and released on the VHS Live from London in 1985. In 1989, the band's Brighton concert included the song and was released on the VHS The Come Back, All is Forgiven Tour: Live. Another version appears on the 1995 album Live at the BBC, which Harley recorded during a session for Nicky Campbell in 1992, and another was included on the 1999 album Stripped to the Bare Bones.

Track listing
CD Single
"Star for a Week (Dino)" - 4:33
"The Lighthouse" - 5:58

Critical reception
Anthony Seymour of The Journal wrote: "Harley's new single, "Star for a Week", sounds promising. Let's hope it gets some air time." In a review of Yes You Can, Dave Thompson of AllMusic said of the song and its B-Side: "It's a sad state of affairs, but the best of Yes You Can, Steve Harley's first new album in a decade, was never going to make it onto a studio recording. Rather, it resides in the live environment where the songs almost unanimously came to life, a fact which Harley himself seemed to acknowledge with the release, just six months later, of Live in the UK. There, both "Star for a Week (Dino)" and "The Lighthouse" emerge with vibrant electricity, as emotionally charged as any old favorites, as deliciously delivered as they deserved. In the studio, however, though the quality remains, the emotion pales, and Harley's energies - hitherto rejuvenated after so long in abeyance - flag accordingly." Thompson also spoke of the song in a review of the Make Me Smile - Live on Tour album from 1996: "The highlights, then, are the same as last time - two cuts from Harley's Yes You Can album, "The Lighthouse" and "Star for a Week," work far more effectively live than they did in the studio."

In a review of Harley's 1998 concert at Sheffield, Peter Kane of Q stated: "To make sure this particular evening goes with a swing, it certainly helps that the audience could have handpicked that very afternoon from the streets of Sheffield. At least half of them seem to know all the words to everything, not just the familiar old stuff like "Judy Teen" and "Mr. Soft", but even the comparatively recent "The Last Time I Saw You" and "Star for a Week (Dino)". They sing along whether encouraged to do so or not. Mostly not. It's like stumbling into a private function with its own mystifying rules and rituals."

In the aftermath of the song's release, Harley has played the song reasonably frequently in his live shows. The song was consistently played by both Harley's rock band and acoustic formats between 1989 and 2006. Since then, the song has been played less often, with the most recent performances of the song taking place in December 2022.

Personnel
Star for a Week (Dino)
 Steve Harley - vocals, producer
 Alan Darby - guitar
 Nick Pynn - violin
 Ian Nice - keyboards
 Billy Dyer - bass
 Paul Francis - drums
 Matt Butler - producer, engineer
 Ian Jones, Steve Rooke - mastering

The Lighthouse
 Steve Harley - vocals, 12 string acoustic guitar, harmonica, producer
 Rick Driscoll - guitar
 Barry Wickens - violin
 Ian Nice - keyboards
 Kevin Powell - bass
 Stuart Elliott - drums
 Matt Butler - producer, engineer
 Simon Smart - engineer
 Ian Jones, Steve Rooke - mastering

References

1993 singles
Steve Harley songs
Songs written by Steve Harley
1992 songs